Richard Sutcliffe (26 January 1849 – 23 July 1930) was an Irish mining engineer and inventor, active in England.

He was born on a farm in Tipperary and worked at coal mines in Ireland between 1857 and 1885. He moved to Barnsley, England in August 1885.  In 1892 he invented the world's first coal cutting machine.  In 1905 he invented the world's first underground conveyor belt. This invention revolutionized the mining industry by greatly reducing the amount of labour needed to transport coal. His company, Richard Sutcliffe Ltd., based in Horbury near Wakefield pioneered the manufacture of conveyor belts used in the mining and assembly line industries. His company devised many other types of mining equipment. His company also produced four documentaries about the manufacturing industry, directed by Lindsay Anderson between 1948 and 1954.

After his death, his children took over his business which was later bought out by a larger company. Today, his descendants run a company that manufactures playground equipment.

References and further reading

Sutcliffe, Richard Joseph Sutcliffe, Edward D. Richard Sutcliffe: The Pioneer of Underground Belt Conveying. Surrey, UK:  R.W. Simpson & Co, 1948

External links
Sutcliffe Play : Playground Equipment - Design and Manufacture at www.sutcliffeplay.co.uk
"Richard Sutcliffe" - Google Patents at www.google.com US patents
Esp@cenet results view at v3.espacenet.com Worldwide patents held

1849 births
1930 deaths
Irish mining engineers
Irish inventors
People from County Tipperary
19th-century Irish engineers
20th-century Irish engineers